San Agustín Altamirano (also known as San Agustín and Altamirano) is a village located in Villa Victoria, in the State of Mexico, Mexico.

References

Populated places in the State of Mexico
Villa Victoria